Oak Park Historic District  is a national historic district located in Hatfield Township, Montgomery County, Pennsylvania. It encompasses 33 contributing buildings and 1 contributing structure dated from 1912 to the 1980s in a planned residential neighborhood.  The residences reflect a variety of popular late 19th- and 20th-century architectural styles including Bungalow / American Craftsman, cottage revival, and Colonial Revival.  The contributing structure is the entry gate to the suburban development.

It was added to the National Register of Historic Places in 1998.

References

Historic districts on the National Register of Historic Places in Pennsylvania
Colonial Revival architecture in Pennsylvania
Historic districts in Montgomery County, Pennsylvania
National Register of Historic Places in Montgomery County, Pennsylvania